Almir de Jesús Soto Maldonado (born 17 July 1994) is a  Colombian professional footballer who plays as a defensive midfielder or as a fullback for Categoría Primera A club Independiente Santa Fe.

Career statistics

Club

1 Includes Recopa Sudamericana and Suruga Bank Championship.

Honours

Club 
Santa Fe
Copa Sudamericana    : 2015

References

1994 births
Living people
Colombian footballers
Colombian expatriate footballers
Categoría Primera A players
Primera Nacional players
Independiente Santa Fe footballers
Fortaleza C.E.I.F. footballers
Nueva Chicago footballers
Patriotas Boyacá footballers
Colombian expatriate sportspeople in Argentina
Expatriate footballers in Argentina
Association football midfielders
Footballers from Barranquilla
21st-century Colombian people